Bodies at Rest is a 2019 action thriller film directed by Renny Harlin, starring Nick Cheung, Richie Jen, and Yang Zi. It is Harlin's third Chinese-language film, following Skiptrace (2016) and Legend of the Ancient Sword (2018). The film had its world premiere as the opening film of the 43rd Hong Kong International Film Festival on March 18, 2019. It was released in China on August 16, 2019.

Plot
A pathologist Chen Jia Hao and his assistant Lynn are working late at a public morgue on a Christmas Eve. Three masked men break into the morgue, trying to retrieve a bullet from a corpse.

Cast
 Nick Cheung as Nick Chan
 Richie Jen as Santa
 Yang Zi as Lynn Qiao
 Clara Lee as Ankie Cheng
 MC Jin as Wyatt (cleaner)

Release
The film had its world premiere as the opening film of the 43rd Hong Kong International Film Festival on March 18, 2019. It was also screened at the Far East Film Festival and the Edinburgh International Film Festival. It was released in China on August 16, 2019. The film earned $18 million in its opening weekend.

Reception

Elizabeth Kerr of The Hollywood Reporter wrote, "Despite its flaws, Bodies grabs you quickly and never really lets go for the entirety of its lean, efficient 90 minutes." She described the film as "the simultaneously derivative and yet entirely amusing hodgepodge." Fionnuala Halligan of Screen International commented that the film "delivers what it promises and no more, but it fulfils its brief with eye-rolling relish."

References

External links
 

2019 films
2010s Christmas films
2019 action thriller films
Chinese action thriller films
Chinese Christmas films
Hong Kong action thriller films
Hong Kong Christmas films
Media Asia films
Films directed by Renny Harlin
2010s Hong Kong films